The electoral district of Kingborough was an electoral district of the Tasmanian House of Assembly. It was based in the region to the immediate south of Tasmania's capital city, Hobart, and included the Huon Valley towns of Cygnet, Huonville, Kettering, Margate and Sandfly.

The seat was created as a single-member seat ahead of the Assembly's first election held in 1856. In 1886, it became a two-member seat and absorbed the neighbouring seat of Queenborough, whose member, Edward Crowther, was to win one of the seats at each of the three elections held under this system. At the 1897 election, Queenborough was recreated and Kingborough returned to being a single-member seat. It was abolished when the Tasmanian parliament adopted the Hare-Clark electoral model for the entire state in 1909.

Members for Kingborough

References
 
 
 Parliament of Tasmania (2006). The Parliament of Tasmania from 1856

Former electoral districts of Tasmania
1856 establishments in Australia
1909 disestablishments in Australia